James Alekos Alexandrou (born 12 April 1985) is an English actor and filmmaker. He is known for portraying the role of Martin Fowler in the BBC One soap opera EastEnders from 1996 to 2007. He was also the presenter of Bizarre Crime on BBC Three.

Early life
Alexandrou was born in Hackney, London, to a Greek Cypriot father and an English mother. He has two sisters, one older, one a twin, as well as a younger brother. He was educated at Chingford Foundation School in Waltham Forest, as well as at Anna Scher Theatre School.

Career
Alexandrou's acting career began in 1996, when he auditioned successfully for the role of Martin Fowler in the BBC One soap opera EastEnders. The character was created shortly after the show's inception in 1985, with the role becoming vacant following the departure of actor Jon Peyton Price in 1996. Alexandrou appeared as Grant in the short film Blessed Burden in 1999.

In July 2003 he participated in a "Soap Stars Special" edition of The Weakest Link. Over Christmas of 2005, Alexandrou starred in the crime caper, Who Stole The Snowman? On 14 April 2006, it was announced that Alexandrou would leave EastEnders in Autumn 2007. He and Natalie Cassidy, who played his on-screen wife Sonia Fowler, left on 2 February 2007 (to tie in with the exits of Wendy Richard and Ray Brooks). When asked about his departure Alexandrou said, "I've decided to leave the show to experience other aspects of my industry. Having turned 21, I felt it was a good time to leave. I owe everything to the show and would love to come back one day - that's if EastEnders would have me."

On 12 October 2014, it was announced that actor James Bye would be taking over playing the role in the character's return to Albert Square. According to BBC News, Alexandrou was said to have "given his blessing to the recasting of the role." When interviewed, Alexandrou implicitly stated that he had turned down the opportunity to return to the show. 

In early 2007, Alexandrou appeared in the play The Homecoming opposite Harold Pinter for BBC Radio 3.

Alexandrou toured the UK and Norway with the British Shakespeare Company from June to September 2007. He played Pistol in Henry V, and Orlando in As You Like It. It was incorrectly reported that he turned down the chance to replace Daniel Radcliffe in the West End revival of Equus in 2007.

In 2008 he appeared in In My Name, a new play by Steven Hevey, at the Old Red Lion Theatre, produced by Yaller Skunk Theatre Company. The play transferred to the Trafalgar Studio 2 from 1 to 19 July 2008. In October 2008, Alexandrou appeared in All Quiet on the Western Front at the Nottingham Playhouse, prior to a UK tour of the production.

In March 2009, he played the part of Romeo in the Globe Theatre's production of Romeo and Juliet. In October 2009, Alexandrou joined up with EastEnders cast members, Natalie Cassidy (Sonia Jackson) and Nina Wadia (Zainab Masood), to star in comedy shorts for BBC Raw Words.

In 2010 Alexandrou filmed his first feature film, Semper Fidel in Cuba. The film was released in 2014. He appeared in the role of The Man in John Goodrum's play The Black Veil a thriller adapted from a Charles Dickens short story.

In 2011 Alexandrou took part in the BBC Learning project, Off By Heart Shakespeare, where he played Mercutio from Romeo and Juliet delivering the speech; "'tis not so deep as a well".

In 2012 Alexandrou toured theatres throughout the United Kingdom, with the Hull Truck Theatre starring as Phil, in the play DNA.

In April 2014, as part of the Shakespeare 450 celebrations, he played the Iago in Grassroots Shakespeare London's production of Othello at Leicester Square Theatre in London's West End and also performed sonnets at the Guildhall with Damian Lewis. Rehearsals were recorded by BBC World Service and James Alexandrou's performance as Iago featured in their programme The Why Factor.

In February 2015, Alexandrou appeared in Silent Witness as Carl Parry. and in 2022 as Ronnie Reynolds in Call the Midwife.

Filmography

Personal life
Alexandrou was in a relationship with EastEnders co-star Kara Tointon which began in April 2006. Their split was reported in November 2007.

References

External links
 

1985 births
Living people
English male child actors
English male soap opera actors
English male stage actors
English male radio actors
People from Islington (district)
English people of Greek Cypriot descent